Thomas Morren (27 March 1871 – 29 January 1929) was an English international footballer, who played as a centre half.

Early life
Morren was born in Sunderland, the second of fifth children. His father was Irish. Like his father he worked as an ironfounder.

Career
Morren played for Middlesbrough Victoria, Middlesbrough Vulcan, Middlesbrough Ironopolis, Middlesbrough, Barnsley St Peters and Sheffield United.

His solitary cap for England came in 1898, where he scored in the British Home Championship match against Ireland.

Later life
Morren had three children and worked as a newsagent and tobacconist in Sheffield. He joined the Royal Air Force in 1918.

References

1871 births
1929 deaths
English footballers
England international footballers
Middlesbrough Ironopolis F.C. players
Middlesbrough F.C. players
Sheffield United F.C. players
English Football League players
Association football central defenders
FA Cup Final players